Leonardo Piepoli (born 29 September 1971 in La Chaux-de-Fonds, Switzerland) is a former Italian professional road racing cyclist. He was later suspended for two years, which effectively ended his career.

Career
He is a record four-time winner (1995, 1999, 2003, 2004) of the Subida a Urkiola. Piepoli is a specialist climber, and this was shown in the 2006 Giro d'Italia, where he was one of the strongest riders in the mountains and won two stages. In the 2007 Giro d'Italia, Piepoli won the mountains classification. He has won stages in the Giro and the Vuelta a España. He also made himself famous by 'gifting' two stage victories to his team-mates Gilberto Simoni and Riccardo Riccò. During the Vuelta, Piepoli lead the mountains classification, but was forced to leave the race, citing 'family problems'

During the 2008 Giro d'Italia Piepoli crashed two times, leaving the race with three broken ribs and with his left hand fractured in two places.

In the 2008 Tour de France, Piepoli won the 10th stage, a mountain stage that climbed the legendary Hautacam, and also helped his team-mate Riccardo Riccò win two stages. Before the twelfth stage, Piepoli and the rest of his team stepped out of the race, after Riccò had tested positive for doping.

Doping allegations
Piepoli was fired from Saunier Duval on 18 July 2008, for what his team called "violation of the team's ethical code." The Spanish newspaper El Pais reported that Piepoli had confessed to EPO usage, using the same third generation form (CERA)  for which his teammate Riccardo Riccò tested positive, but he denied this at the Italian National Olympic Committee's investigation into Riccò's case.  On 6 October 2008, it was announced that two of Piepoli's samples from the Tour de France had also tested positive for CERA EPO. In a 7 January 2009 interview with the Italian newspaper Gazzetta dello Sport, Piepoli acknowledged that he had used CERA in "a moment of weakness". In January 2009, he was suspended  from the sport for two years.

Career achievements

Major results

1995
 1st Subida a Urkiola
 1st Mountains classification, Tour de Suisse
1998
 2nd Overall Vuelta a Burgos
1st Stage 4 
 3rd Clásica San Sebastián
1999
 1st  Overall Vuelta a Castilla y León
1st Stage 2 
 1st Subida a Urkiola
 1st Stage 4 Vuelta a Burgos
2000
 1st  Overall Vuelta a Burgos
1st Mountains classification 
 1st  Overall Vuelta a Aragón
 2nd Subida a Urkiola
 10th Overall Giro d'Italia
2002
 1st  Overall Vuelta a Aragón
1st Stage 1
 1st  Overall Vuelta Asturias
1st Stage 4
2003
 1st  Overall Vuelta a Aragón
1st Stage 1
 1st Subida a Urkiola
 1st Subida al Naranco
2004
 1st Subida a Urkiola
 1st Stage 9 Vuelta a España
 3rd Overall Tour de Romandie
 3rd Overall Vuelta a Burgos
 3rd Overall Vuelta a Aragón
 3rd Subida al Naranco
2005
 2nd Overall Volta a Catalunya
1st Stage 4 
 10th Overall Tour de Suisse
2006
 Giro d'Italia
1st Stage 13 & 17
 8th Overall Critérium du Dauphiné Libéré
2007
 Giro d'Italia
1st  Mountains classification
1st Stage 10
 1st Stage 9 Vuelta a España

Grand Tour general classification results timeline

DNF - Did not finish

See also
 List of doping cases in cycling

References

External links

1971 births
Doping cases in cycling
Living people
Italian male cyclists
Italian Vuelta a España stage winners
Italian Giro d'Italia stage winners
Italian Tour de France stage winners
Italian sportspeople in doping cases
People from La Chaux-de-Fonds
People of Apulian descent
Sportspeople from the canton of Neuchâtel
21st-century Italian people